Natural world may refer to the following:
 The non-human aspects of the physical universe, such as
 Biosphere
 Natural environment
 Nature
 Natural World (TV series), a BBC wildlife documentary